Brusen Nunatak is a lone peak  west of Mount Gjeita in the Hansen Mountains. It was mapped and named by Norwegian cartographers working from air photos taken by the Lars Christensen Expedition, 1936–37.

References 

Nunataks of Kemp Land